Economic methodology is the study of methods, especially the  scientific method,  in relation to economics,  including principles underlying economic reasoning.  In contemporary English, 'methodology' may reference  theoretical or systematic aspects of a method (or several methods). Philosophy and economics also takes up methodology at the intersection of the two subjects.

Scope

General methodological issues include similarities and contrasts to the natural sciences and to other social sciences and, in particular, to:
 the definition of economics
 the scope of economics as defined by its methods 
 fundamental principles and operational significance of economic theory 
 methodological individualism versus holism in economics
 the role of simplifying assumptions such as rational choice and profit maximizing in explaining or predicting phenomena
 descriptive/positive, prescriptive/normative, and applied uses of theory
 the scientific status and expanding domain of economics
 issues critical to the practice and progress of econometrics
 the balance of empirical and philosophical approaches
 the role of experiments in economics
 the role of mathematics and mathematical economics in economics 
 the writing and rhetoric of economics
 the relation between theory, observation, application, and methodology in contemporary economics.<ref>• Wassily Leontief, 1971. "Theoretical Assumptions and Nonobserved Facts", American Economic Review, 61(1), pp. 1-7. Reprinted in W. Leontief, 1977, Essays in Economics, v. 1, ch. III, pp. 24-34.   • Mark Blaug, 1992. The Methodology of Economics: Or How Economists Explain, 2nd ed., Cambridge. Description and Preview.   • Roger Backhouse and Mark Blaug, 1994. New Directions in Economic Methodology, Routledge. Contents preview.   • P.A.G. van Bergeijk et al., 1997. Economic Science and Practice: The Roles of Academic Economists and Policy-Makers. Description  & preview links.   • D. Wade Hands, 2001. Without Rules: Economic Methodology and Contemporary Science Theory, Oxford. Description and contents preview.   • Christopher A. Sims, 1996. "Macroeconomics and Methodology", Journal of Economic Perspectives, 10(1), pp. 105-120.    • Kevin D. Hoover, 2001. The Methodology of Empirical Macroeconomics,  Oxford. Description and  preview.   • Bruno S. Frey, 2001. "Why Economists Disregard Economic Methodology, Journal of Economic Methodology, 8(1), pp. 41–47 .</ref>

Economic methodology has gone from periodic reflections of economists on method to a distinct research field in economics since the 1970s. In one direction, it has expanded to the boundaries of philosophy, including the relation of economics to the philosophy of science and the theory of knowledge  In another direction of philosophy and economics, additional subjects are treated including decision theory and ethics.

See also
 Economic systems
 Methodology of econometrics
 Model (economics)

 Notes 

References
 John Bryan Davis, D. Wade Hands, Uskali Mäki (1998). Handbook of Economic Methodology, E. Elgar
 Hands, D. Wade, ed. (1993). The Philosophy And Methodology Of Economics, Duke University
 Hausman, Daniel M. (1984). The Philosophy of Economics: An Anthology. New York: Cambridge University Press, 
 Boland, L. (1982) The Foundations of Economic Method, London: Geo. Allen & Unwin.
 Boland, L. (1989) The Methodology of Economic Model Building: Methodology after Samuelson, London: Routledge.
 Boland, L. (1997) Critical Economic Methodology: A Personal Odyssey, London: Routledge
 Boland, L. (2003) The Foundations of Economic Method: A Popperian Perspective, London: Routledge
 D.N. McCloskey (1983). The Rhetoric of Economics, Univ of Wisconsin Press, 1998
 Daniel M. Hausman (1992). Essays on Philosophy and Economic Methodology, Cambridge University Press, 1992
 Nell, E.J. and Errouaki, K. (2011) Rational Econometric Man. Edward Elgar.
 Düppe, T. (2011). How Economic Methodology Became a Separate Science, Journal of Economic Methodology, 18 (2): 163-176.

External links
 Journal of Economic Methodology - page @ EconPapers
 Daniel M. Hausman, Philosophy of Economics (with focus on methodology), Stanford Encyclopedia of Philosophy''
 Milton Friedman, "The Methodology of Positive Economics" (excerpts) 

 
Interdisciplinary subfields of economics